Napier Hill is a limestone outcrop and suburb rising above the lowland districts of the city of Napier on New Zealand's North Island.

The north-east end, Bluff Hill, has a steep cliff face overlooking the Port of Napier. It features Napier Girls' High School, the historic former Napier Prison and a scenic walk.

The western end, Hospital Hill, was the site of the former Napier Hospital, whose services were transferred to Hawke's Bay Hospital in Hastings in 1999. The building was demolished in 2015 after years of sitting derelict and the land has recently been purchased (December 2020) by the Napier City Council to be developed for use as a new reservoir to replace the current ageing water source on Enfield Road.
European settlement on the hill began in 1855. Most homes on the hill were built in the 1920s.

Napier Botanical Gardens were established in the 1860s, and were for a long time the only public park in the city.

Prior to the 1931 Hawke's Bay earthquake, the hill was almost surrounded with water, with just two shingle spits running north and south, and was known as Scinde Island. The earthquake raised the Napier area and the sea receded from around the island and the spits. Scinde Island was named after the province of Sindh, then in India and now in Pakistan. The Napier soccer club Scindians derived their name from Scinde Island.

Demographics

Napier Hill had a population of 5,502 at the 2018 New Zealand census, an increase of 249 people (4.7%) since the 2013 census, and an increase of 102 people (1.9%) since the 2006 census. There were 2,271 households, comprising 2,679 males and 2,820 females, giving a sex ratio of 0.95 males per female, with 885 people (16.1%) aged under 15 years, 828 (15.0%) aged 15 to 29, 2,763 (50.2%) aged 30 to 64, and 1,026 (18.6%) aged 65 or older.

Ethnicities were 89.8% European/Pākehā, 11.8% Māori, 1.4% Pacific peoples, 5.0% Asian, and 2.0% other ethnicities. People may identify with more than one ethnicity.

The percentage of people born overseas was 23.0, compared with 27.1% nationally.

Although some people chose not to answer the census's question about religious affiliation, 54.7% had no religion, 33.0% were Christian, 0.5% had Māori religious beliefs, 0.9% were Hindu, 0.1% were Muslim, 0.7% were Buddhist and 3.2% had other religions.

Of those at least 15 years old, 1,482 (32.1%) people had a bachelor's or higher degree, and 480 (10.4%) people had no formal qualifications. 1,002 people (21.7%) earned over $70,000 compared to 17.2% nationally. The employment status of those at least 15 was that 2,370 (51.3%) people were employed full-time, 765 (16.6%) were part-time, and 162 (3.5%) were unemployed.

Education

Bluff Hill and Hospital Hill have three schools:

Residents also use two nearby schools:

References

Napier, New Zealand
Landforms of the Hawke's Bay Region
Hills of New Zealand
Suburbs of Napier, New Zealand
Populated places around Hawke Bay